Blacknuss is an album by Rahsaan Roland Kirk. It was recorded in 1971 and released by Atlantic Records.

Recording and music
The album was recorded in New York City on August 31 and September 8, 1971. Much of the material is pop tunes.

Release and reception

Blacknuss was released by Atlantic Records. The AllMusic reviewer wrote: "Blacknuss [...] is Kirk at his most visionary. [...] Blacknuss is as deep as a soul record can be and as hot as a jazz record has any right to call itself." The Penguin Guide to Jazz wrote that "Some of the arrangements are guitar-heavy and the backbeats are decidedly uncouth", and that the record label probably influenced the choice of material, but that Kirk was comfortable with playing it.

Track listing
"Ain't No Sunshine" (Bill Withers) – 2:26 
"What's Goin' On/Mercy Mercy Me (The Ecology)" (Renaldo Benson, Al Cleveland, Marvin Gaye)  – 3:47 
"I Love You, Yes I Do" (Chris Allen, Johnny Cameron) – 2:49 
"Take Me Girl, I'm Ready" (Johnny Bristol, Pam Sawyer, LaVerne Ware) – 3:18 
"My Girl" (Smokey Robinson, Ronald White) – 3:06 
"Which Way Is It Going"  (Rahsaan Roland Kirk) – 2:26 
"One Nation"  (Princess Patience Burton) – 3:41 
"Never Can Say Goodbye" (Clifton Davis) – 4:02 
"Old Rugged Cross" (Trad.) – 7:15 
"Make It With You" (David Gates) – 4:50 
"Blacknuss" (Kirk) – 5:12

Source:

Personnel
Rahsaan Roland Kirk - flute, electric guitar, gong, tenor saxophone, tin whistle, stritch, manzello, vocals
Princess Patience Burton - vocals
Billy Butler - electric guitar
Cornell Dupree - electric guitar
Dick Griffin - trombone
Cissy Houston - vocals
Arthur Jenkins - conga drums, cabasa
Richard Landrum - conga drums, percussion
Keith Loving - electric guitar
Charles McGhee - trumpet
Khalil Mhrdi - drums
Henry Pearson - bass guitar
Bernard "Pretty" Purdie - drums
Bill Salter - bass guitar
Sonelius Smith - piano
Richard Tee - piano
Joseph "Habao" Texidor - Percussion
Mickey Tucker - Organ
Joel Dorn - Producer

References

1972 albums
Rahsaan Roland Kirk albums
Albums produced by Joel Dorn
Atlantic Records albums